
Ashburn may refer to:

Places

Canada
Ashburn, Ontario

United States
Ashburn, Georgia
Ashburn, Chicago, Illinois, a community area
Ashburn (Metra), a Metra station serving the area
Ashburn, Missouri
Ashburn, Virginia, an unincorporated area in Loudoun County, part of the Washington metropolitan area.
Ashburn station (Washington Metro), a WMATA station serving the area

People
Ashburn (surname)

See also
 Ashbourne (disambiguation)